Fort Stevens may refer to one of two decommissioned American military forts:

Fort Stevens (Oregon), a fort in Oregon that guarded the mouth of the Columbia River
Fort Stevens (Washington, D.C.), a fort in Washington, D.C. that defended the city during the Civil War